Triclops can refer to:

 Tri-Klops, a character in the Masters of the Universe toyline
 Triclops, a character in the Jedi Prince series of Star Wars novels
 Triclops, a race of creatures from the 3x3 Eyes anime and manga
 Triclops!, an acid punk band
 Triclops, an anthology of short stories by Avery Mathers, Susan Howe and Lee Williams